Sebastián Alejandro Arrieta (born 21 October 1985 in Añatuya, Santiago del Estero Province) is an Argentine footballer currently playing for Instituto.

External links
 Argentine Primera statistics  }
 Statistics at BDFA 

1985 births
Living people
Sportspeople from Santiago del Estero Province
Argentine people of Basque descent
Argentine footballers
Association football midfielders
Newell's Old Boys footballers
Racing Club de Avellaneda footballers
Atlético de Rafaela footballers
Instituto footballers
Unión de Santa Fe footballers
Argentine Primera División players